Are You My Love? may refer to:

 "Are You My Love?", a song from the 2002 1 Giant Leap album, What About Me?
 "Are You My Love?", a song from the 1936 film Dancing Pirate

See also
 Where Are You My Love? (disambiguation)
 You Are My Love (disambiguation)